Eusphalerum is a genus of ocellate rove beetles in the family Staphylinidae. There are at least 130 described species in Eusphalerum.

See also
 List of Eusphalerum species

References

Further reading

External links

 

Omaliinae